Ngô Bảo Châu (born June 28, 1972) is a Vietnamese-French mathematician at the University of Chicago, best known for proving the fundamental lemma for automorphic forms (proposed by Robert Langlands and Diana Shelstad). He is the first Vietnamese national to have received the Fields Medal.

Early life
Ngô Bảo Châu was born in 1972, the son of an intellectual family in Hanoi, North Vietnam. His father, professor Ngô Huy Cẩn, is full professor of physics at the Vietnam National Institute of Mechanics. His mother, Trần Lưu Vân Hiền, is a physician and associate professor at an herbal medicine hospital in Hanoi.

The beginning of Châu's schooling was at an experimental elementary school that had been founded by the revolutionary pedagogue Hồ Ngọc Đại, but when his father returned from the Soviet Union with his doctoral degree, he decided that Châu would learn more in traditional schools and enrolled him in the "chuyên toán" (special classes for gifted students in mathematics) at the Trưng Vương Middle School.
At age 15, Châu entered the special mathematics class at the High School for Gifted Students, Hanoi University of Science (Khối chuyên Tổng Hợp – Đại học Khoa Học Tự Nhiên Hà Nội), formerly known as the A0-class. In grades 11 and 12, Châu participated in the 29th and 30th International Mathematical Olympiads (IMO) and became the first Vietnamese student to win two IMO gold medals, of which the first one was won with a perfect score (42/42).

After high school, Châu expected to study in Budapest, but in the aftermath of the fall of Communism in Eastern Europe, the new Hungarian government halted scholarships to students from Vietnam. After visiting Châu's father, Paul Germain, secretary of the French Academy of Sciences, arranged for Châu to study in France. He was offered a scholarship by the French government for undergraduate study at the Paris VI University, then in 1992, he entered the École Normale Supérieure. He obtained a PhD in 1997 from the Universite Paris-Sud under the supervision of Gérard Laumon.  He became a member of CNRS at Paris 13 University from 1998 to 2005, and defended his habilitation degree there in 2003. He holds both Vietnamese and French citizenship.

Career
Châu became a professor at Paris-Sud 11 University in 2005. In 2005, at age 33, Chau received the title of professor in Vietnam, becoming the country's youngest-ever professor.  Since 2007, Châu has worked at the Institute for Advanced Study, Princeton, New Jersey, as well as the Hanoi Institute of Mathematics. He joined the mathematics faculty at the University of Chicago on September 1, 2010. In addition, since 2011 he has been Scientific Director of the newly founded Vietnam Institute for Advanced Study in Mathematics (VIASM). In 2016 Châu was Co-General Chair of Asiacrypt the first time that the Asian cryptography conference was held in Vietnam.

Work
Châu first came to prominence by proving, in joint work with Gérard Laumon, the fundamental lemma for unitary groups. Their general strategy was to understand the local orbital integrals appearing in the fundamental lemma in terms of affine Springer fibers arising in the Hitchin fibration. This allowed them to employ the tools of geometric representation theory, namely the theory of perverse sheaves, to study what was initially a combinatorial problem of a number-theoretic nature. Chau eventually succeeded in formulating the proof for the fundamental lemma for Lie algebras in 2008. Together with results from Jean-Loup Waldspurger, who had earlier deduced stronger forms of the fundamental lemma from this result, this completed the proof of the fundamental lemma in all cases. As a result, Châu was awarded a Fields Medal in 2010.

Ngô Bảo Châu was the co-author of the Vietnamese children's book Ai and Ky in the land of the invisible numbers.

Awards
In 2004, Châu and Laumon were awarded the Clay Research Award for their achievement in solving the fundamental lemma for the case of unitary groups. Châu's proof of the general case was selected by Time as one of the Top Ten Scientific Discoveries of 2009. In 2010, he received the Fields Medal. By decree on 22 April 2011, he was awarded a Knight of France's Legion of Honour. In 2012, he became a fellow of the American Mathematical Society. In 2021, he became an honorary member of the London Mathematical Society.

Major publications
 Ngô, Bao Châu. Le lemme fondamental pour les algèbres de Lie. [The fundamental lemma for Lie algebras] Publ. Math. Inst. Hautes Études Sci. 111 (2010), 1–169. doi:10.1007/s10240-010-0026-7

References

External links

 Ngô Bảo Châu's homepage at the University of Chicago
 Personal blog 
 
 
 Ngo Bao Chau and Gérard Laumon's proof of the Fundamental Lemma for unitary groups.
 The Oberwolfach Prize 2007 is awarded to Ngo Bao Chau (Laudatio by Prof. Rapoport)

1972 births
Living people
People from Hanoi
Paris-Sud University alumni
École Normale Supérieure alumni
21st-century Vietnamese mathematicians
21st-century French mathematicians
University of Chicago faculty
Fields Medalists
Members of the French Academy of Sciences
Institute for Advanced Study visiting scholars
Clay Research Award recipients
Fellows of the American Academy of Arts and Sciences
Fellows of the American Mathematical Society
International Mathematical Olympiad participants
Simons Investigator
People educated at High School for Gifted Students, Hanoi University of Science
Paris-Saclay University people
Paris-Saclay University alumni
Academic staff of Sorbonne Paris North University
Naturalized citizens of France
Vietnamese emigrants to France